The Rachicerinae are a small monogeneric subfamily of flies belonging to the family Xylophagidae.

References 

Xylophagidae
Brachycera subfamilies